Callum Thomas Owen Paterson (born 13 October 1994) is a professional footballer who plays for Sheffield Wednesday as a striker and the Scotland national football team. Paterson started his career with Heart of Midlothian, helping them win promotion to the Scottish Premiership in 2015. He moved to Cardiff City in 2017, and helped them win promotion to the Premier League in 2018. In 2020, he signed for Sheffield Wednesday.

Paterson mainly played for Hearts as a right-back, but was also sometimes used as a striker. Cardiff mainly used him as a midfielder, but he occasionally played higher up the pitch to help aid the attack. He has been praised for his work rate, pace, aerial ability, positioning, and goalscoring prowess. He is also known for his array of goal celebrations.

Early life
Paterson's father is Scottish and his mother is from Zimbabwe. His maternal grandfather is South African. Paterson was born in London and moved from there to Scotland when he was three years old. He grew up in South Queensferry where he attended Queensferry High School. He is the cousin of fellow footballer Michael Travis.

Club career

Heart of Midlothian
Paterson began his career as a youth player at Tynecastle before joining Heart of Midlothian in 2010. A member of the club's Under-20 side he was promoted to the first team during pre-season in the summer of 2012 and made his first team debut on 14 July, in a friendly against Raith Rovers where he scored the first goal of the game. Having impressed during these pre-season fixtures, on 4 August he made his Scottish Premier League (SPL) debut aged 17, in a 2–0 win over St Johnstone. He made his European debut on 23 August, in a 1–0 defeat to Liverpool at Tynecastle. 

On 31 August 2012, Paterson signed a new contract extending his stay with the club until 2015. On 22 September 2012, he scored his first two Career goals in a 3–0 win over Dundee Utd in the SPL. On 22 January 2013, Paterson suffered ligament damage to his foot in training that ruled him out of the Scottish League Cup Semi-final against Inverness that weekend. The injury required surgery and ultimately ruled him out for the remainder of the season. During his debut season Paterson made twenty seven appearances, scoring four times In doing so he played as a right-back, midfielder and as a striker, with the latter being the position he played in before joining Hearts.

On 11 August 2013, Paterson scored his first goal of the 2013–14 campaign, when he headed home the only goal in the Edinburgh derby against Hibernian at Tynecastle. On 27 April 2014, Paterson scored a brace against city rivals Hibernian in a 2–1 win. A week later he scored again in a 5–0 win over Kilmarnock and also scored three days later against Partick Thistle. Hearts were relegated at the end of the season, but immediately won promotion by winning the 2014–15 Scottish Championship. In their first season back in the top flight, Hearts finished third in the 2015–16 Scottish Premiership and qualified for European competition.

During the summer of 2016, Patterson was subject to interest from several EFL Championship sides, with Hearts rejecting two bids from Wigan Athletic. Despite the interest, he stayed at the club, managing to score 9 goals in 20 appearances, before suffering a serious knee injury on 27 December, which ruled him out for six to nine months. Despite missing the last few months of the season, Paterson managed to pick up the club's Young Player of the Year Award.

Cardiff City
On 7 June 2017, Paterson agreed a three-year deal with EFL Championship club Cardiff City. The knee injury suffered at Hearts kept him out of the first two months of the season, making his playing return for the Under-23 side in a 4–0 win over Burnley, on 18 September. On 21 October, Paterson returned to the first team, making his debut in a 1–0 win over Middlesbrough, before scoring his first goal for the club, the winner at Barnsley, a month later. Cardiff manager, Neil Warnock moved Paterson into a central midfield position in the new year, later stating the reasoning behind the move was because he couldn't defend. Following his move to the new position, Paterson scored a brace against Sunderland on 13 January and found the back of the net three times in March. He continued his good form throughout the rest of the season, scoring 10 goals, ending as the club's top goal scorer in the league, as they were promoted to the Premier League. Paterson was also voted Young Player of the Season by the Cardiff fans.

Paterson played his first Premier League game against Bournemouth on the opening day of the season. As Cardiff struggled for goals, Paterson was moved into a central forward role, where he scored his first Premier League goal in a 4–2 win over Fulham.

Sheffield Wednesday
On 30 September 2020, he joined EFL Championship club Sheffield Wednesday for an undisclosed fee. He made his club debut the following weekend against Queens Park Rangers and scored his first goal for the club against Brentford on 21 October 2020. He would win the clubs player of the month for January after scoring goals against Derby County and Exeter City as well as the final game in December against Middlesbrough.

On the opening day of the 2021-22 season against Charlton Athletic, he would suffer a nasty head injury following a collision after Paterson cleared a certain goal.

International career
Paterson earned caps at both under-18 and under-19 level in 2012 before establishing himself as a regular in Scotland under-21 squads.

On 10 November 2014, manager Gordon Strachan called Paterson into the senior Scottish squad for the first time after Phil Bardsley pulled out of the squad injured, ahead of a European qualifier against the Republic of Ireland and a friendly against England.

He made his senior debut for Scotland on 29 May 2016 in a 1–0 friendly defeat against Italy.

Career statistics

Honours
Heart of Midlothian
Scottish Championship: 2014–15

Cardiff City
EFL Championship runner-up: 2017–18

Individual
Heart of Midlothian Young Player of the Year: 2016–17
Cardiff City Young Player of the Year: 2017–18

See also
 List of Scotland international footballers born outside Scotland

References

External links

1994 births
Living people
Scottish footballers
Scotland youth international footballers
Heart of Midlothian F.C. players
Scottish Premier League players
Footballers from Greater London
Footballers from Edinburgh
Association football utility players
Scotland under-21 international footballers
Scottish Professional Football League players
People educated at Queensferry High School
Scotland international footballers
Scottish people of South African descent
Scottish people of Zimbabwean descent
Cardiff City F.C. players
English Football League players
Association football fullbacks
Association football midfielders
Association football forwards
Premier League players
Anglo-Scots
Sheffield Wednesday F.C. players